An internal drainage board (IDB) is a type of operating authority which is established in areas of special drainage need in England and Wales with permissive powers to undertake work to secure clean water drainage and water level management within drainage districts. The area of an IDB is not determined by county or metropolitan council boundaries, but by water catchment areas within a given region. IDBs are geographically concentrated in the Broads, Fens in East Anglia and Lincolnshire, Somerset Levels and Yorkshire.

In comparison with public bodies in other countries, IDBs are most similar to the Waterschappen of the Netherlands, Consorzi di bonifica e irrigazione of Italy, wateringen of Flanders and Northern France, Watershed Districts of Minnesota, United States and Marsh Bodies of Nova Scotia, Canada.

Responsibilities

Much of their work involves the maintenance of rivers, drainage channels (rhynes), ordinary watercourses, pumping stations and other critical infrastructure, facilitating drainage of new developments, the ecological conservation and enhancement of watercourses, monitoring and advising on planning applications and making sure that any development is carried out in line with legislation (NPPF). IDBs are not responsible for watercourses designated as main rivers within their drainage districts; the supervision of these watercourses is undertaken by the Environment Agency.

The precursors to internal drainage boards date back to 1252; however, the majority of today's IDBs were established by the national government following the passing of the Land Drainage Act 1930 and today predominantly operate under the Land Drainage Act 1991 under which, an IDB is required to exercise a general supervision over all matters relating to water level management of land within its district. Some IDBs may also have other duties, powers and responsibilities under specific legislation for the district (for instance the Middle Level Commissioners are also a navigation authority). IDBs are responsible to Defra from whom all legislation/regulations affecting them are issued. The work of an IDB is closely linked with that of the Environment Agency which has a range of functions providing a supervisory role over them.

Regulation

Defra brought IDBs under the jurisdiction of the Local Government Ombudsman (LGO) from 1 April 2004, and introduced a model complaints procedure for IDBs to operate. This move was aimed to increase the accountability of IDBs to the general public who have an interest in the way that IDBs are run and operate by providing an independent means of review. At this time Defra also revised and re-issued model statutory rules and procedures under which IDBs operate.

Current internal drainage boards of England

There are 112 internal drainage boards in England in 2018 covering 1.2 million hectares (9.7% of England's total land area) and  Areas around The Wash, the Lincolnshire Coast, the lower reaches of the Trent and the Yorkshire Ouse, the Somerset Levels and the Fens have concentrations of adjacent IDBs covering broad areas of lowland. In other parts of the country IDBs stretch in narrow ‘fingers’ up river valleys, separated by less low-lying areas, especially in Norfolk and Suffolk, Sussex, Kent, West Yorkshire, Herefordshire/Shropshire and the northern Vale of York. The largest IDB (Lindsey Marsh DB) covers 52,757 hectares and the smallest (Cawdle Fen IDB) 181 hectares. 24 of the county councils in England include one or more IDB in their area as do six metropolitan districts, and 109 unitary authorities or district councils.

The Association of Drainage Authorities holds a definitive record of all IDBs within England and Wales and their boundaries.

The Environment Agency acts as the internal drainage board for one internal drainage district in East Sussex. In Wales internal drainage districts are managed by Natural Resources Wales.

Water level management and flood risk

IDBs have an important role in reducing flood risk through management of water levels and drainage in their districts. The water level management activities of internal drainage boards cover 1.2 million hectares of England which represents 9.7% of the total land area. Reducing the flood risk to ~600,000 people who live or work, and ~879,000 properties located in IDB districts. Whilst many thousands of people outside of these boundaries also derive reduced flood risk from IDB water level management activities. Several forms of critical infrastructure fall within IDB districts including; 56 major power stations (28%) are located within an Internal Drainage District, 68 other major industrial premises and 208 km of motorway. In fact a recent publication by the Association of Drainage Authorities identified that 53% of the installed capacity (potential maximum power output) of major power stations in England and Wales are located within an IDB.

Although of much reduced significance since the 1980s, many IDB districts in Yorkshire and Nottinghamshire lie in areas of coal reserves and drainage has been significantly affected by subsidence from mining. IDBs have played an important role in monitoring and mitigating the effects of this activity and have worked in close collaboration with the coal companies and the Coal Authority.

Maintenance of watercourses

The fundamental role of an internal drainage board is to manage the water level within its district. The majority of lowland rivers and watercourses have been heavily modified by man or are totally artificial channels. All are engineered structures designed and constructed for the primary function of conveying surplus run-off to their outfall efficiently and safely, managing water levels to sustain a multitude of land functions. As with any engineered structure it must be maintained in order to function at or near its design capacity. Annual or bi-annual vegetation clearance and periodic de-silting (dredging) of these rivers and watercourses is therefore an essential component of the whole life cycle of these watercourses.

Accommodating sustainability within the design and maintenance process for lowland rivers and watercourses has to address three essential elements:

 year round conveyance of flows,
 storage of flood peaks,
 retention and protection of flora and fauna dependent on or resident in the water corridor.

Many IDBs are redesigning watercourses to create a two-stage or bermed channel. These have been extensively created in the Lindsey Marsh Drainage Board area of East Lincolnshire to accommodate the three elements of lowland watercourse sustainability.

Berms are created at or near to the normal retained water level in the system. It is sometimes replanted with vegetation removed from the watercourse prior to improvement works but is often left to re-colonise naturally. In all cases this additional part of the channel profile allows for enhanced environmental value to develop. The area created above the berm also provides additional flood storage capacity whilst the low level channel can be maintained in such a manner that design conveyance conditions are achieved and flood risk controlled.

By widening the channel and the berm, the berm can be safely used as access for machinery carrying out channel maintenance. While in-channel habitat that develops can be retained for a much longer period during the summer months, flood storage is provided for rare or extreme events and a buffer zone between the channel and any adjacent land use is created.

The timing of vegetation clearance works is essential to striking a sustainable balance in lowland watercourses. The Conveyance Estimating System (CES) is a modelling tool developed through a Defra / Environment Agency research collaboration. IDBs use CES to estimate the seasonal variation of conveyance owing to vegetation growth and other physical parameters which they use to assess the impact of varying the timing of vegetation clearance operations. This is critical during the spring and early summer, the prime nesting season for aquatic birds, the breeding season for many protected mammal species such as water voles and the season when many rare species of plant life flower and seed. Many IDBs have developed vegetation control strategies in co-ordination with Natural England.

Pumping stations

111 IDB districts require pumping to some degree for water level management and 79 are purely gravity boards (where no pumping is required). 53 IDBs have more than 95% of their area dependent on pumping. A new pumping station was commissioned in April 2011 by the Middle Level Commissioners at Wiggenhall St Germans, Norfolk. When running at full capacity, it is capable of draining five Olympic-size swimming pools every 2 minutes.

Emergency actions

During times of heavy rainfall and high river levels IDBs:

 liaise with the Environment Agency over developing flood conditions
 check sensitive locations and remove restrictions
 take actions, where possible, to reduce risk of flooding to property
 advise local authorities on the developing situation in order that Local Authorities can execute their emergency
 plan effectively for the protection of people, property and critical infrastructure
 assist where possible in any post-flood remedial and clearance operations
 assess flooding incidents to determine if new works can be undertaken to reduce the effect of future flooding incidents

An IDB's priorities during flooding are:

 ensuring the board's systems are working efficiently
 protection of people and residential properties
 protection of commercial properties
 protection of agricultural land and ecologically sensitive sites

Some IDBs are able to provide a 24-hour contact number and most extend office hours during severe emergencies.

Planning guidance

Associated with the powers to regulate activities that may impede drainage, IDBs provide comments to local planning authorities on developments in their district and when asked, make recommendations on measures required to manage flood risk and to provide adequate drainage.

Environmental responsibilities

Internal drainage boards in England have responsibilities associated with 398 Sites of Special Scientific Interest plus other designated environmental areas, in coordination with Natural England. Slow flowing drainage channels such as those managed by IDBs can form an important habitat for a diverse community of aquatic and emergent plants, invertebrates and higher organisms. IDB channels form one of the last refuges in the UK of the BAP registered spined loach (Cobitis Taenia), a small nocturnal bottom-feeding fish that have been recorded only in the lower parts of the Trent and Great Ouse catchments, and in some small rivers and drains in Lincolnshire and East Anglia. All IDBs are currently engaging with their own individual biodiversity action plans which will further enhance their environmental role.

Many IDBs are involved with assisting major wetland biodiversity projects with organisations such as the RSPB, National Trust and the Wildfowl and Wetlands Trust. Many smaller conservation projects are co-ordinated with Wildlife Trusts and local authorities. Current projects include: The Great Fen Project (Middle Level Commissioners), Newport Wetlands Reserve (Caldicot and Wentlooge Levels IDB) and WWT Welney (MLC). Middle Level Commissioners launched a three-year Otter Recovery Project in December 2007. It will build 33 otter holts and 15 other habitat areas.

Drainage rates

All properties within a drainage district are deemed to derive benefit from the activities of an IDB. Every property is therefore subject to a drainage rate paid annually to the IDB.

For the purposes of rating, properties are divided into:

 Agricultural land and buildings
 Other land (such as domestic houses, factories, shops etc.)

Occupiers of all "other land" pay Council Tax or non-domestic rates to the local authority who then are charged by the board. This charge is called the "Special Levy". The board, therefore, only demands drainage rates direct on agricultural land and buildings. The basis of this is that each property has been allotted an "annual value" which were last revised in the early 1990s. The annual value is an amount equal to the yearly rent, or the rent that might be reasonably expected if let on a tenancy from year to year commencing 1 April 1988. The annual value remains the same from year to year. Each year the board lays a rate "in the £" to meet its estimated expenditure. This is multiplied by the annual value to produce the amount of drainage rate due on each property.

Precepts

Under Section 141 of the Water Resources Act 1991 the Environment Agency may issue a precept to an IDB to recover a contribution that the agency considers fair towards their expenses.

Under Section 57 of the Land Drainage Act 1991, in cases where a drainage district receives water from land at a higher level, the IDB may make an application to the Environment Agency for a contribution towards the expenses of dealing with that water.

District drainage commissioners

District drainage commissioners (DDCs) are internal drainage boards set up under local legislation rather than the Land Drainage Act 1991 and its predecessor legislation. The majority of the provisions of the Land Drainage Acts, do however, apply to such commissioners and they are statutory public bodies. The most important in terms of size and revenue is the Middle Level Commissioners.

Association of Drainage Authorities

The majority of internal drainage boards are members of the Association of Drainage Authorities (ADA) their representative organisation. Through ADA the collective views of drainage authorities and other members involved in water level management are represented to government, regulators, other policy makers and stakeholders. At a European level ADA represents IDBs through EUWMA.

In 2013 it was announced that the Caldicot and Wentlooge Levels Internal Drainage Board  was to be abolished in April 2015, after officials at the Wales Audit Office detailed a list of irregularities, including the board overpaying its most senior member of staff, paying thousands of pounds for trips abroad for its members, and occasionally acting unlawfully.

References

External links
 Association of Drainage Authorities
 Defra Flood and Coastal Risk Management
 European Union of Water Management Associations

Internal drainage board websites
 Bedford Group of Drainage Boards
 Black Sluice Internal Drainage Board
 Caldicot and Wentlooge Levels Internal Drainage Board
 Downham Market Group of Internal Drainage Boards
 Ely Group of Internal Drainage Boards
 Lower Aire & Don Consortia of Drainage Boards
 Lower Ouse Internal Drainage Board
 Lower Severn Internal Drainage Board
 Lindsey Marsh Drainage Board
 Market Weighton Internal Drainage Board
 Medway Internal Drainage Boards
 Middle Level Commissioners
 Newark Area Internal Drainage Board
 North East Lindsey Internal Drainage Board
 North Level District Internal Drainage Board
 River Stour (Kent) Internal Drainage Board
 Romney Marsh Area Internal Drainage Board
 Shire Group of Internal Drainage Boards
 Somerset Drainage Boards Consortium
 Vale of Pickering Internal Drainage Boards
 Upper Witham Internal Drainage Board
 Water Management Alliance
 Welland and Deepings Internal Drainage Board
 West Mendip Internal Drainage Board
 Whittlesey Consortium of Internal Drainage Boards
 Witham First District Internal Drainage Board
 Witham Third District Internal Drainage Board
 Witham 4th District Internal Drainage Board
 York Consortium of Drainage Boards

Department for Environment, Food and Rural Affairs
Public bodies and task forces of the United Kingdom government
Water management authorities in the United Kingdom
Hydrology
Hydraulic engineering
Land drainage in the United Kingdom